The Saint-Hyacinthe Lauréats are a Junior "A" ice hockey team from Saint-Hyacinthe, Quebec, Canada.  They are a part of the Quebec Junior AAA Hockey League.

History
The Saint-Hyacinthe Laureats were added to the Quebec Junior AAA Hockey League for the 2012-13 season.

Season-by-Season results

External links
Laureats homepage
QJAAAHL Webpage

Ligue de Hockey Junior AAA Quebec teams
Sport in Saint-Hyacinthe
Ice hockey clubs established in 2012